Collective rights management is the licensing of copyright and related rights by organisations acting on behalf of rights owners. Collective management organisations (CMOs), sometimes also referred to as collecting societies, typically represent groups of copyright and related rights owners, i.e; authors (such as writers, composers, painters and photographers), performers (such as musicians, actors and dancers), publishers, phonogram producers, film producers and other rights holders  At the least, rights holders authorize collective rights management organizations to monitor the use of their works, negotiate licenses with prospective users, document correct right management data and information, collect remuneration for use of copyrighted works, ensuring a fair distribution of such remuneration amongst rightsholders. WMOs also act on legal mandates. Governmental supervision varies across jurisdictions.

History 
Collective rights management is almost as old as copyright law itself. Collective rights management through a CMO/collecting society first occurred in France in 1777 for the use of dramatic and literary works in theatre, attributed to the efforts of Pierre Beaumarchais. The first WMO in music was established in 1850 in France.

Types of rights under collective management 
Collective rights management through CMOs may cover a range of exclusive rights granted under copyright law, whether licensed by rights holders or subject to statutory collective management, including:

 the right to public performance, for example when music is played or performed in bars or clubs.
 the right to broadcasting, for example when live or recorded performances are broadcast on radio or television
 the mechanical reproduction rights in recorded music, for example where works are reproduced for recording and distribution purposes, such as CDs or online streaming
 the performing rights in dramatical works, for example when a theatre plays a work
 the rights of reprographic reproduction of literary, visual and musical works, for example where a book or sheet music are copied using a photocopier
 related rights, for example the rights of performers and producers in recorded music when used in broadcasts

Collective management organisations
The collective management of copyright and related rights is undertaken by various types of CMOs. CMOs act on behalf of their members, which may be authors or performers, and issue copyright licenses to users authorising the use of the works of their members or foreign rights holders they represent. CMOs also negotiate the royalty rates and other licence terms on behalf of their members and members of foreign CMOs which whom they have agreements, collect royalty payment on behalf of rights holders and document right management data and information. Royalties are then distributed by the local or foreign CMO to their members, who, as individual rights holders, are generally not directly involved in the negotiation of the licence

CMOs typically exist in a situation where it would be impossible or impractical for owners of copyright and related rights to manage their rights directly, and where it is to their advantage that the licensing of the rights that they own or represent be aggregated with a CMO. The CMO’s authority is typically conveyed by its statute (if membership-based), by voluntary mandates, by representation agreements with other CMOs and/or by national law. In most cases, CMOs are organized on a not-for-profit basis and are owned or controlled by their members.

A key concern for CMOs is the correct management of the vast amounts of data and information that they collect about their members, their works, other creative contributions and their usages. Documentation is thus vital for a smooth functioning of CMOs at the national, regional, and the international level. CMOs need to collect information about right holders and works, such as identifiers, names and pseudonyms, titles, shares, sub-publishing and licensing agreements, as well as information about usages in various media. This information allows CMOs to collect royalties and match and distribute them to right holders. Many CMOs use IT solutions aiming at facilitating CMOs’ day-to-day operations and their cooperation with CMOs from other countries.

Different models of collective management 

Different models of collective management are available, depending on types of works and rights to be managed and national law. Three typical collective management schemes are outlined below, but there are also other models, and in some cases these co-exist, depending on the national legal and licensing framework at hand.

Under voluntary collective management, a CMO issues licenses on behalf of rights holders it represents, who have given a mandate to the CMO to act on their behalf. The voluntary collective management system is based on the principles of freedom of association and freedom of contract. 

Under the mandatory collective licensing model, rights holders do not have the choice of granting permissions on an individual basis. All claims must be made through a CMO, under this system. The mandatory collective licensing system is usually established by national legislations or regulations. 

The mandatory collective management is usually considered as a limitation of exclusive rights of copyright or related rights, because, under this system, rights holders cannot decide how to exercise their rights. Therefore, the mandatory collective management might be applied only to the extent allowed by the three-step-test of the international copyright-related treaties.  

On the other hand, for rights to remuneration, the mandatory collective management is usually not considered as a limitation but an enabler of efficient management of such rights; because the rights holders of rights to remuneration are not in a position to decide whether or not they authorize the acts covered and, thus, the objective is just to collect the remuneration. This is the reason why mandatory collective management is often applied to rights to remuneration, including but not limited to, cases of transfer of rights by authors and performers to producers, or to private copying levies, in many countries.

Under the extended collective licensing model, agreements between users and a CMO in a given category of works will be extended by virtue of the law to cover all rights holders in the same category. This is called the extension effect and it also covers the works of those rights holders that have not mandated the CMO (non-members of the CMO), unless they have prohibited the use of their works.  

A CMO may combine and operate under any or a combination of these different models for different rights, as provided for under national law.

See also
List of copyright collection societies
Extended collective licensing
Voluntary collective licensing
Private copying levy
Syndicate

References

Collective rights
 
Copyright licenses